A transformer is a deep learning model that adopts the mechanism of self-attention, differentially weighting the significance of each part of the input data. It is used primarily in the fields of natural language processing (NLP) and computer vision (CV).

Like recurrent neural networks (RNNs), transformers are designed to process sequential input data, such as natural language, with applications towards tasks such as translation and text summarization. However, unlike RNNs, transformers process the entire input all at once. The attention mechanism provides context for any position in the input sequence. For example, if the input data is a natural language sentence, the transformer does not have to process one word at a time. This allows for more parallelization than RNNs and therefore reduces training times.

Transformers were introduced in 2017 by a team at Google Brain and are increasingly the model of choice for NLP problems, replacing RNN models such as long short-term memory (LSTM). The additional training parallelization allows training on larger datasets. This led to the development of pretrained systems such as BERT (Bidirectional Encoder Representations from Transformers) and GPT (Generative Pre-trained Transformer), which were trained with large language datasets, such as the Wikipedia Corpus and Common Crawl, and can be fine-tuned for specific tasks.

Background 
Before transformers, most state-of-the-art NLP systems relied on gated RNNs, such as LSTMs and gated recurrent units (GRUs), with added attention mechanisms. Transformers also make use of attention mechanisms but, unlike RNNs, do not have a recurrent structure. This means that provided with enough training data, attention mechanisms alone can match the performance of RNNs with attention.

Sequential processing 
Gated RNNs process tokens sequentially, maintaining a state vector that contains a representation of the data seen prior to the current token. To process the th token, the model combines the state representing the sentence up to token  with the information of the new token to create a new state, representing the sentence up to token . Theoretically, the information from one token can propagate arbitrarily far down the sequence, if at every point the state continues to encode contextual information about the token. In practice this mechanism is flawed: the vanishing gradient problem leaves the model's state at the end of a long sentence without precise, extractable information about preceding tokens.
The dependency of token computations on the results of previous token computations also makes it hard to parallelize computation on modern deep-learning hardware. This can make the training of RNNs inefficient.

Self-attention 
These problems were addressed by attention mechanisms. Attention mechanisms let a model draw from the state at any preceding point along the sequence. The attention layer can access all previous states and weigh them according to a learned measure of relevance, providing relevant information about far-away tokens.

A clear example of the value of attention is in language translation, where context is essential to assign the meaning of a word in a sentence. In an English-to-French translation system, the first word of the French output most probably depends heavily on the first few words of the English input. However, in a classic LSTM model, in order to produce the first word of the French output, the model is given only the state vector after processing the last English word. Theoretically, this vector can encode information about the whole English sentence, giving the model all the necessary knowledge. In practice, this information is often poorly preserved by the LSTM. An attention mechanism can be added to address this problem: the decoder is given access to the state vectors of every English input word, not just the last, and can learn attention weights that dictate how much to attend to each English input state vector.

When added to RNNs, attention mechanisms increase performance. The development of the Transformer architecture revealed that attention mechanisms were powerful in themselves and that sequential recurrent processing of data was not necessary to achieve the quality gains of RNNs with attention. Transformers use an attention mechanism without an RNN, processing all tokens simultaneously and calculating attention weights between them in successive layers. Since the attention mechanism only uses information about other tokens from lower layers, it can be computed for all tokens in parallel, which leads to improved training speed.

Architecture

Input 
The input text is parsed into tokens by a byte pair encoding tokenizer, and each token is converted via a word embedding into a vector. Then, positional information of the token is added to the word embedding.

Encoder–decoder architecture 
Like earlier seq2seq models, the original Transformer model used an encoder–decoder architecture. The encoder consists of encoding layers that process the input iteratively one layer after another, while the decoder consists of decoding layers that do the same thing to the encoder's output.

The function of each encoder layer is to generate encodings that contain information about which parts of the inputs are relevant to each other. It passes its encodings to the next encoder layer as inputs. Each decoder layer does the opposite, taking all the encodings and using their incorporated contextual information to generate an output sequence. To achieve this, each encoder and decoder layer makes use of an attention mechanism.

For each part of the input, attention weighs the relevance of every other part and draws from them to produce the output. Each decoder layer has an additional attention mechanism that draws information from the outputs of previous decoders, before the decoder layer draws information from the encodings.

Both the encoder and decoder layers have a feed-forward neural network for additional processing of the outputs and contain residual connections and layer normalization steps.

Scaled dot-product attention 
The transformer building blocks are scaled dot-product attention units. When a sentence is passed into a transformer model, attention weights are calculated between every token simultaneously. The attention unit produces embeddings for every token in context that contain information about the token itself along with a weighted combination of other relevant tokens each weighted by its attention weight.

For each attention unit, the transformer model learns three weight matrices; the query weights , the key weights , and the value weights . For each token , the input word embedding  is multiplied with each of the three weight matrices to produce a query vector , a key vector , and a value vector . The attention weights are divided by the square root of the dimension of the key vectors, which stabilizes gradients during training, and passed through a softmax which normalizes the weights.

The attention calculation for all tokens can be expressed as one large matrix calculation using the softmax function, which is useful for training due to computational matrix operation optimizations that quickly compute matrix operations. Then we can represent the attention as

where softmax is taken over the horizontal axis.

Multi-head attention 
One set of  matrices is called an attention head, and each layer in a transformer model has multiple attention heads. While each attention head attends to the tokens that are relevant to each token, with multiple attention heads the model can do this for different definitions of "relevance". In addition, the influence field representing relevance can become progressively dilated in successive layers. Many transformer attention heads encode relevance relations that are meaningful to humans. For example, some attention heads can attend mostly to the next word, while others mainly attend from verbs to their direct objects. The computations for each attention head can be performed in parallel, which allows for fast processing. The outputs for the attention layer are concatenated to pass into the feed-forward neural network layers.

Masked attention 
It may be necessary to cut out attention links between some word-pairs. For example, the decoder for token position  should not have access to token position . This may be accomplished before the softmax stage by adding a mask matrix  that is negative infinity at entries where the attention link must be cut, and zero at other places.

Encoder 
Each encoder consists of two major components: a self-attention mechanism and a feed-forward neural network. The self-attention mechanism accepts input encodings from the previous encoder and weights their relevance to each other to generate output encodings. The feed-forward neural network further processes each output encoding individually. These output encodings are then passed to the next encoder as its input, as well as to the decoders.

The first encoder takes positional information and embeddings of the input sequence as its input, rather than encodings. The positional information is necessary for the transformer to make use of the order of the sequence, because no other part of the transformer makes use of this.

The encoder is bidirectional. Attention can be placed on tokens before and after the current token. Tokens are used instead of words to account for polysemy.

Positional encoding 

A positional encoding is a fixed-size vector representation that encapsulates the relative positions of tokens within a target sequence: it provides the transformer model with information about where the words are in the input sequence. 

The positional encoding is defined as a function of type , where  is a positive even integer. The full positional encoding - as defined in the original paper - is given by the equation:where .

Here,  is a free parameter that should be significantly larger than the biggest  that would be input into the positional encoding function. In the original paper, the authors chose .

The function is in a simpler form when written as a complex function of type where .

The main reason the authors chose this as the positional encoding function is that it allows one to perform shifts as linear transformations:where  is the distance one wishes to shift. This allows the transformer to take any encoded position, and find the encoding of the position n-steps-ahead or n-steps-behind, by a matrix multiplication.

By taking a linear sum, any convolution can also be implemented as linear transformations:for any constants . This allows the transformer to take any encoded position and find a linear sum of the encoded locations of its neighbors. This sum of encoded positions, when fed into the attention mechanism, would create attention weights on its neighbors, much like what happens in a convolutional neural network language model. In the author's words, "we hypothesized it would allow the model to easily learn to attend by relative position".

In typical implementations, all operations are done over the real numbers, not the complex numbers, but since complex multiplication can be implemented as real 2-by-2 matrix multiplication, this is a mere notational difference.

Other positional encoding schemes exist.

Decoder 
Each decoder consists of three major components: a self-attention mechanism, an attention mechanism over the encodings, and a feed-forward neural network. The decoder functions in a similar fashion to the encoder, but an additional attention mechanism is inserted which instead draws relevant information from the encodings generated by the encoders. This mechanism can also be called the encoder-decoder attention.

Like the first encoder, the first decoder takes positional information and embeddings of the output sequence as its input, rather than encodings. The transformer must not use the current or future output to predict an output, so the output sequence must be partially masked to prevent this reverse information flow. This allows for autoregressive text generation. For all attention heads, attention can't be placed on following tokens. The last decoder is followed by a final linear transformation and softmax layer, to produce the output probabilities over the vocabulary.

GPT has a decoder-only architecture.

Alternatives 

Training transformer-based architectures can be expensive, especially for long inputs. This is done using locality-sensitive hashing and reversible layers.

Ordinary transformers require a memory size that is quadratic in the size of the context window. Attention Free Transformers reduce this to a linear dependence while still retaining the advantages of a transformer by linking the key to the value.

A benchmark for comparing transformer architectures was introduced in late 2020 by the name of Long Range Arena.

Training

Methods for stabilizing training 
The plain Transformer architecture has difficulty converging. In the original paper the authors recommended using learning rate warmup. That is, the learning rate should linearly scale up from 0 to maximal value for the first part of the training (usually recommended to be 2% of the total number of training steps), before decaying again.

 found that using layer normalization before (instead of after) multiheaded attention and feedforward layers stabilizes training, not requiring learning rate warmup.

Pretrain-finetune 
Transformers typically undergo self-supervised learning involving unsupervised pretraining followed by supervised fine-tuning. Pretraining is typically done on a larger dataset than fine-tuning, due to the limited availability of labeled training data. Tasks for pretraining and fine-tuning commonly include:
 language modeling
 next-sentence prediction
 question answering
 reading comprehension
 sentiment analysis
 paraphrasing

Applications 
The transformer has had great success in natural language processing (NLP), for example the tasks of machine translation and time series prediction. Many pretrained models such as GPT-2, GPT-3, GPT-4, BERT, XLNet, RoBERTa and ChatGPT demonstrate the ability of transformers to perform a wide variety of such NLP-related tasks, and have the potential to find real-world applications. These may include:
 machine translation
 document summarization
 document generation
 named entity recognition (NER)
 biological sequence analysis
 video understanding.

Implementations 
The transformer model has been implemented in standard deep learning frameworks such as TensorFlow and PyTorch.

Transformers is a library produced by Hugging Face that supplies transformer-based architectures and pretrained models.

See also

References

Further reading 

 Hubert Ramsauer et al. (2020), "Hopfield Networks is All You Need", preprint submitted for ICLR 2021. ; see also authors' blog
– Discussion of the effect of a transformer layer as equivalent to a Hopfield update, bringing the input closer to one of the fixed points (representable patterns) of a continuous-valued Hopfield network
 Alexander Rush, The Annotated transformer, Harvard NLP group, 3 April 2018

Neural network architectures